United States national under-20 soccer team may refer to:

 United States men's national under-20 soccer team
 United States women's national under-20 soccer team